K3CS is a studio double album by Peter Freeman. It was released posthumously on the zOaR Records label on April 1, 2022. The album is composed of two records, Sinistar and Mercurial. Sinistar was a record that Freeman had finished prior to his death in 2021 but was unreleased. Mercurial was an unreleased record from 2000, composed entirely of highly processed bass sounds. The album, K3CS, was named after Freeman's amateur radio callsign.

Track listing

Personnel
Credits adapted from liner notes.

Musicians
 Peter Freeman – bass, electronics, guitar
 Rick Cox – electric guitar
 Knox Chandler - electric guitar
 Jamie Muhoberac – keyboards
 Sterling Campbell – drums
 Jeff Martin - guitar

Technical personnel
 Peter Freeman – production
 Anton Sanko – post-production / consultation
 Elliott Sharp – post-production / consultation
 Bryce Goggin - recording, additional engineering
 Victoria Faust – cover photos
 Rick Cox – additional images
 Pasquale Carbonaro - rear cover photo

References

2022 albums